Kaysie Smashey (born April 11, 1980) is an American former professional tennis player.

Smashey, who was born and raised in El Paso, played college tennis on a scholarship for the Texas Longhorns between 1999 and 2002. On the professional tour, Smashey reached a best ranking of 451 in singles and 146 in doubles. She made four doubles main-draw appearances on the WTA Tour, with her best performance a quarterfinal appearance at Memphis in 2005. Her four ITF doubles titles included the $50,000 Waikoloa tournament.

ITF Circuit finals

Doubles: 14 (4 titles, 10 runner-ups)

References

External links
 
 

1980 births
Living people
American female tennis players
Texas Longhorns women's tennis players
Tennis people from Texas
Sportspeople from El Paso, Texas